Mark Andrew O'Connor (born 10 March 1963) is an English former footballer who played as a midfielder in the Football League for Queens Park Rangers, Exeter City, Bristol Rovers, AFC Bournemouth and Gillingham.

Playing career
O'Connor was born in Rochford and began his career with Queens Park Rangers. He made only three appearances for Rangers in three seasons, and the 1983–84 campaign he spent out on loan at Exeter City. He joined Bristol Rovers in the summer of 1984. O'Connor earned one cap for the Republic of Ireland U21 side against England in 1985. He spent one and half years at Eastville Stadium making 99 appearances scoring 13 goals before leaving for AFC Bournemouth in March 1986. O'Connor spent five seasons at Dean Court making 148 appearances and helped the Cherries win the Third Division title in 1986–87. He then went on to play for Gillingham and then made a return to Bournemouth before ending his career back at Gillingham helping the side gain promotion in 1995–96. He broke his leg against Fulham on 25 November 1995 in a tackle with Martin Thomas which resulted in his retirement from playing just over a year later.

Coaching career
After ending his playing career in 1998 he moved into coaching with manager Tony Pulis at Gillingham whom he played with at Bournemouth. He moved with Pulis to Portsmouth in June 2000 and became their academy manager where he remained until 2005 when he linked up again with Pulis at Plymouth Argyle. He spent a season at Plymouth before moving back to Stoke City with Pulis to become one of his first-team coaches alongside former teammate Adrian Pennock in June 2006. He left Stoke at the end of the 2012–13 season. On 22 July 2013 O'Connor joined Bristol City as their under-21 manager.

In January 2015 O'Connor joined West Bromwich Albion to work again with Pulis and Kemp.

Career statistics
Source:

A.  The "Other" column constitutes appearances and goals in the Football League Trophy and Full Members Cup.

Honours
 AFC Bournemouth
 Football League Third Division champions: 1986–87

References

External links
 

1963 births
Living people
English footballers
Gillingham F.C. players
Bristol Rovers F.C. players
Queens Park Rangers F.C. players
Exeter City F.C. players
AFC Bournemouth players
Republic of Ireland under-21 international footballers
Plymouth Argyle F.C. non-playing staff
Stoke City F.C. non-playing staff
West Bromwich Albion F.C. non-playing staff
Association football midfielders